The 2010 Ligas Superiores, the fifth division of Peruvian football (soccer), will be played by variable number teams by Department. The tournaments will be played on a home-and-away round-robin basis. 
For the 2010, they are nine the Departmental Confederacies that have determined to adopt them: Arequipa, Cajamarca, Callao, Cusco, Huánuco, Lambayeque, Pasco, Piura, Puno and Tumbes. 

The Liga Departamental de Ayacucho decided the suspension of the Liga Superior de Ayacucho for this season 2010 by the lack of participants and because the tournament has lost the force of previous seasons due to the good actions of Inti Gas Deportes in the Primera División Peruana.

Liga Superior de Arequipa

Liguilla

Liga Superior de Cajamarca

Playoff

Liga Superior del Callao

Quarterfinals

Semifinals

Finals

Liga Superior de Cusco

Liga Superior de Huánuco

Liguilla

Playoff

Liga Superior de Lambayeque

Liguilla

Liga Superior de Pasco

Liga Superior de Piura

Liga Superior de Puno

Pentagonal

Liga Superior de Tumbes

Semifinals

Liguilla Final

Final

Last Update: June 19, 2010Source: 
Copa Peru

External links
 Dechalaca.com - Copa Peru 2010
 Liga Superior de Huánuco 2010 - Cinco son suficientes
 Diario Correo Cusco - La Liga Superior de Cusco ya cuenta con fechas
 Diario Chaski - CONFIRMADO: LIGA SUPERIOR DE FUTBOL DE CUSCO INICIA TORNEO EL 21 DE FEBRERO

5
2010